The men's 4 × 100 metres relay sprint competition of the athletics events at the 2015 Pan American Games took place on July 24 and 25, 2015 at CIBC Pan Am and Parapan Am Athletics Stadium. The United States team, consisting of Sean McLean, Wallace Spearmon, Kendal Williams, and Remontay McClain were awarded the gold medal following the disqualification of Team Canada.  Canada clearly won the race in lane 8, but before the final exchange, Aaron Brown began his acceleration by running in lane 7 before correcting and receiving the baton within the lane 8 exchange zone.

Records
Prior to this competition, the existing world and Pan American Games records were as follows:

Qualification

Each National Olympic Committee (NOC) ranked in the world's top 16 was able to enter one team.

Schedule

Results
All times shown are in seconds.

Semifinals

Final

Canada won the race with a time of 38.06. However, the team was disqualified for leaving their lane, Rule 163.3; the team had faced similar incidents at the 2014 Commonwealth Games and the 2015 IAAF World Relays.

References

Athletics at the 2015 Pan American Games
2015